The War College Lieutenant General Luis María Campos is the university and staff college of the Armed Forces of the Argentine Republic. It was founded by Lt Gen Luis María Campos and opened in 1900.

The school offers undergraduate, graduate and postgraduate courses. The subjects taught are: Staff officer courses, logistics, strategic intelligence, military history, geopolitics, science subjects, international relations, and education studies. Since 1949 over 3,000 officers have studied there. The school has also taught senior officers of twenty foreign countries.

References 

The information in this article is based on that in :es:Escuela Superior de Guerra (Argentina).

External links 
Official website "Bienvenidos a la Escuela Superior de Guerra" 

Universities in Argentina